The 1960 European Baseball Championship was held in Spain and was won by the Netherlands for the fourth time in a row. Italy finished as runner-up.

Ron Fraser served as manager of the Netherlands.

Standings

References

(NL) European Championship Archive at honkbalsite

European Baseball Championship
European Baseball Championship
1960
1960 in Spanish sport